Rugbyclub Wageningen, also known RC Wageningen, is a Dutch rugby club in Wageningen, in central Netherlands.

History
The club was founded on 7 May 1970. At its first 5-year jubileum the first ever Dutch women's rugby match was organised in Wageningen.

External links
 RC Wageningen

Dutch rugby union teams
Rugby clubs established in 1970
Rugby